Ian Anthony Pearce (born 7 May 1974) is an English football coach and former professional footballer who is the head of recruitment at West Bromwich Albion.

As a player he was defender from 1990 until 2012, notably in the Premier League for Blackburn Rovers where he won the title in 1995. He also played top flight football for Chelsea, West Ham United and Fulham. He played in the Football League for Southampton and Lincoln City, as well as for non-league sides Oxted & District, Kingstonian and Lingfield. He was capped three times by the England U21 team in 1995.

Since retiring he has since worked on the coaching staff at Lincoln City and worked as a scout for Brighton & Hove Albion before taking up his current role with West Brom.

Club career

Chelsea
Pearce started his career at Oxted & District FC before signing for Chelsea during the 1991–92 season. He made his debut on 11 May 1991 in a 2–2 draw with Aston Villa. He made five substitute appearances in three seasons for the west London club, before moving to Blackburn Rovers in October 1993 for a fee of £300,000.

Blackburn Rovers
Pearce's Blackburn debut was in a League Cup third-round replay against Shrewsbury Town on 9 Nov 1993, in which Pearce scored the winning goal in extra time. He scored his first League goal in April 1994 after coming on as a substitute in a 2–1 win at West Ham United, a result which guaranteed Rovers a place in Europe for the first time in their history. He moved to centre-half the following season, forming a formidable partnership with Colin Hendry, and won a Premier League medal in the 1994–95 season.

West Ham United
Pearce moved to West Ham United for £2.3 million on 9 October 1997. After playing regularly in his first two seasons with the club, and being named as runner-up in the 1999 Hammer of the Year award, he played just 37 minutes in 1999–2000 after injuring knee ligaments in a clash with teammate Stuart Pearce. Pearce was out for 14 months, returning on 28 October 2000 against Newcastle United. He failed to find his true fitness, and only made 17 appearances in the 2000–01 season. He was able to take part in pre-season training for the first time in five years in 2002–03, and despite some further niggling injuries, made 33 appearances in all competitions. He continued his form into the 2003–04, registering 26 starts in the First Division, before moving to Fulham in the January transfer window.

Fulham
Pearce signed for Fulham in January 2004 in a deal which involved an undisclosed transfer fee and Andy Melville moving to West Ham. He started nine games of that season as Fulham's first choice centre back. He made his debut in a match against Tottenham Hotspur at Loftus Road on 31 January 2004.

However, in his 2004–05 season, he was hampered with a back injury sustained in December 2004. He did manage to play a few reserve games at the end of the season, but did not play for the first team. In August 2005, he was close to signing for Norwich City, but pulled out because of family reasons.

Pearce was praised as 'Best player in pre season' by then Fulham manager Chris Coleman. His admirable resolve was demonstrated when in a 1–1 draw against Portsmouth he played through a painful foot injury only to score an equaliser before time and secure a critical point for Fulham.

On 22 February 2008, he joined Southampton on a 30-day loan deal. Injury restricted him to one appearance, in a 1–1 draw against Scunthorpe United.

Pearce had a trial for Brentford and played against Staines Town in a 3–0 win.

Later career
Pearce joined Surrey South Eastern Combination side Oxted & District, the club where his career began, in September 2008 and scored on his debut. Pearce signed for Kingstonian of the Isthmian League Premier Division on 21 August 2009 as an attacking midfielder and forward and made his competitive debut for the club against Aveley. He left the club on 27 September.

On 9 October 2009, in addition to his contract as assistant manager, Pearce signed a playing contract with Lincoln City. On 17 October, Pearce made his playing debut for Lincoln, coming on as a substitute in their 1–0 away defeat to Northampton Town. He was sent off as an unused substitute in a match against Cheltenham Town on 14 November 2009. He returned for Kingstonian on 19 March 2011, in the 2–0 win over Lowestoft Town. He also played for Lingfield in 2011, where he linked up with fellow ex-pro Nicky Forster.

International career
Pearce was part of the England under-20 team that came third in the 1993 FIFA World Youth Championship, playing in all six matches and scoring one goal. He was capped three times for England at under-21 level in the mid-1990s, but never made the senior national side.

Coaching career
On 30 September 2009, Pearce signed for Lincoln City as the club's assistant manager to newly appointed Chris Sutton, a former teammate at Blackburn Rovers. He left when Sutton resigned on 29 September 2010.

In 2014, he joined Brighton & Hove Albion as a scout. On 1 November 2018, he joined West Bromwich Albion as head of recruitment.

Career statistics

Honours
Blackburn Rovers
Premier League: 1994–95

Cricket
In 2009 Ian Pearce made his debut for Oxted and Limpsfield Cricket Club (Sunday XI) who compete in the Surrey League. As of 2020, Pearce has a top score of 89, with an average of 16.12, and in the field has affected 4 run outs and taken 18 catches.

References

External links

1974 births
Living people
Sportspeople from Bury St Edmunds
Footballers from Suffolk
English footballers
England youth international footballers
England under-21 international footballers
Association football central defenders
Blackburn Rovers F.C. players
Chelsea F.C. players
Fulham F.C. players
West Ham United F.C. players
Southampton F.C. players
Kingstonian F.C. players
Lincoln City F.C. players
Premier League players
English Football League players
Isthmian League players
Lincoln City F.C. non-playing staff
Alumni of the University of Salford
West Bromwich Albion F.C. non-playing staff
Association football coaches